Tomingas is an Estonian surname. Notable people with the surname include:

Karl Heinrich Tomingas (1892–1969), Estonian politician
Kärt Tomingas (born 1967), Estonian actress, singer, and lecturer
Külli Tomingas (born 1972), Estonian opera singer
Tuuli Tomingas (born 1995), Estonian biathlete

Estonian-language surnames